Edward Elonzo Miller (born March 5, 1901) was an American Negro league baseball player. He played from 1924 to 1931.

References

External links
 and Seamheads

1901 births
Year of death missing
Chicago American Giants players
Indianapolis ABCs players
Homestead Grays players
People from Calvert, Texas